The 2016–17 Toronto Maple Leafs season was the 100th season for the National Hockey League franchise that was established on November 22, 1917. The Maple Leafs finished the season with 95 points (their highest in 12 years) and qualified for the playoffs for the first time since the 2012–13 season.

Off-season
The off-season was relatively quiet for the Maple Leafs relative to previous seasons. On July 1, the opening day of free agency, Toronto signed forward Matt Martin to a four-year, $10 million contract, then brought back defenceman Roman Polak on a one-year deal the following day. Justin Holl, who had played with the Marlies the previous season, also signed a one-year deal. At the end of July, forward Trevor Moore from the University of Denver signed a three-year, entry level contract after impressing the organization during rookie training camp a few weeks earlier, which Moore had been personally invited to. No more moves were made until nearly a month later when, on August 22, Jhonas Enroth was signed to a one-year deal to backup newly acquired goaltender Frederik Andersen. Mark Hunter was also promoted to an assistant general manager, while Brandon Prust and Raman Hrabarenka were signed to professional try outs.

Standings

Record vs opponents

Notes
 Game decided in overtime
 Game decided in a shootout

Schedule and results

Pre-season

Regular season

Overtime statistics

Playoffs

The Maple Leafs clinched a playoff spot for the first time since the 2012–13 season. They qualified as the second wildcard team in the Eastern Conference and faced the Washington Capitals, the division winner with the best record, in the first round. Washington won the series in 6 games, 4–2. This was the third playoff series in NHL history where five games were decided in overtime, the first occurring in the 1951 Stanley Cup Finals between the Toronto Maple Leafs and the Montreal Canadiens, and the second in the 2012 Western Conference Quarterfinals between the Phoenix Coyotes and the Chicago Blackhawks.

Player statistics
Final stats

Skaters

Goaltenders

†Denotes player spent time with another team and has now joined the Maple Leafs. Stats reflect time with the Maple Leafs only.
‡Denotes player spent time with the Maple Leafs and has now joined another team. Stats reflect time with the Maple Leafs only.
Bold/italics denotes franchise record.

Awards and honours

Awards

Milestones

Records
Auston Matthews
 First #1 Overall pick to score a hat trick in their NHL debut: October 12, 2016
 First 4 goal game for a player in their NHL debut: October 12, 2016
 First Maple Leafs player to score a hat trick in their debut: October 12, 2016
 Most points by rookie in Leafs history (69)
 Most goals by rookie in Leafs history (40)
 Most goals by US-born rookie (40)
 Most game-winning goals by rookie in Leafs history (8)

Mitch Marner
 Most assists by rookie in Leafs history (42)

William Nylander
 Longest rookie point streak in Leafs history (12 games)
 Most power play points by rookie in Leafs history (25)
 Most power play goals by rookie in Leafs history (9)

Zach Hyman
 Longest rookie assist streak in Leafs history (6 games)
 Most shorthanded goals by rookie in Leafs history (4)

Transactions
The Maple Leafs have been involved in the following transactions during the 2016–17 season.

Trades

Free agents acquired
Players signed to professional try out contracts are not included in this table. Please see off-season for try outs.

Free agents lost

Claimed via waivers

Lost via waivers

Lost via retirement

Player signings

Draft picks

Below are the Toronto Maple Leafs' selections at the 2016 NHL Entry Draft, held on June 24–25, 2016 at the First Niagara Center in Buffalo, New York.  The Leafs held on to each of their picks in all seven rounds, and acquired an additional four picks through various trades.

Pick Notes
  The Washington Capitals' second-round pick went to the Toronto Maple Leafs as the result of a trade on February 28, 2016 that sent Daniel Winnik and Anaheim's fifth-round pick in 2016 to Washington in exchange for Brooks Laich, Connor Carrick and this pick.
  The New Jersey Devils' third-round pick went to the Toronto Maple Leafs as the result of a trade on July 1, 2015 that sent Phil Kessel, Tyler Biggs, Tim Erixon and a conditional second-round pick in 2016 to Pittsburgh in exchange for Nick Spaling, Kasperi Kapanen, Scott Harrington, a conditional first-round pick in 2016 and this pick.
Pittsburgh previously acquired this pick as compensation for New Jersey hiring John Hynes as their head coach on June 2, 2015.
  The Colorado Avalanche's fourth-round pick went to the Toronto Maple Leafs as the result of a trade on February 21, 2016 that sent Shawn Matthias to Colorado in exchange for Colin Smith and this pick.
  The St. Louis Blues' sixth-round pick went to the Toronto Maple Leafs as the result of a trade  March 2, 2015 that sent Olli Jokinen to St. Louis in exchange for Joakim Lindstrom and this pick (being conditional at the time of the trade). The condition – Toronto will receive a sixth-round pick in 2016 if St. Louis fails to make it to the 2015 Stanley Cup Finals – was converted on April 26, 2015.

References

Toronto Maple Leafs seasons
Toronto Maple Leafs
Toronto
2017 in Toronto